Edmund Ernest Garcia (March 25, 1905 – November 2, 1971) was a Rear Admiral in the United States Navy who commanded the destroyer escort  during World War II and participated in the invasions of North Africa, Sicily, and France.

Early years
Garcia was born to Enrique García and Antonia Rumirez in San Juan, Puerto Rico, the capital city of the island. There he received both his primary and secondary education. Garcia was born into a family with a long tradition of military servitude. His  father, Enrique Garcia, was a captain in the United States Army. In 1922, Garcia graduated from high school and received an appointment to the United States Naval Academy from Emmet Montgomery Reily, who served as appointed Governor of Puerto Rico from (1921–1923).

Naval career
Garcia, was supposed to graduate from the academy in 1926, however he did not graduate and receive his commission of ensign until June 17, 1927, because of his academic deficiency in mathematics.

Garcia's first assignment was aboard  where he served as an artillery officer from 1927 to 1928. Garcia received addition training in various military institutions which included the Torpedo School of San Diego, California.

This was with the exception of the years 1935 to 1937, when he served as flight instructor at Naval Aviation School in Pensacola. In 1939, he was reassigned to Fort Mifflin, Pennsylvania where he helped prepare and equip the aircraft carrier . He worked on various aircraft carriers until 1941, when the United States entered World War II.

World War II
 
In February 1942, Garcia assumed command of the minesweeper  at the Washington Navy Yard, in Washington, DC.  In June 1942 Cormorant was reclassified as a tugboat.

Between 18 January and 19 May 1943, Cormorant gave tug services at Guantánamo Bay to destroyers in training there, and entered the Charleston Navy Yard for repairs in June.  Garcia was then transferred to serve as prospective commanding officer of the destroyer escort .

In June 1943 he reported to the Brown Shipbuilding Co. in Houston, Texas where Sloat was being built.
 
On November 11, Sloat, was assigned to the Escort Division (CortDiv) 7, and sailed out of New York Harbor with convoy UGS-24 bound for Norfolk and North Africa. The convoy arrived at Casablanca on December 2, and returned to New York on December 25, 1943.

On January 10, 1944, Sloat sailed to Casablanca and returned to New York on March. That same month Sloat joined a convoy, consisting of 72 merchant ships and 18 LSTs, which was guarded by Task Force (TF) 64. Two planes were shot down and two damaged while only one ship in the convoy was damaged. The convoy arrived at Bizerte on April 3.

Eight days later, Sloat joined another convoy and returned to New York on May 1. García was awarded the Bronze Star Medal with Combat "V" for his actions. Part of the citation reads as follows:

From June 15 to July 15, Sloat operated in the Caribbean Sea and Atlantic Ocean in search of German U-boats.

Later years
From 1944 to 1945, Garcia served as commandant of the 58th Escort Division aboard . Upon his return to the United States after the war, Garcia served as commanding officer of the Naval Recruitment Station in New Orleans, Louisiana.

Garcia died November 2, 1971, in his home in Ozona, Florida. He was buried with full military honors in Arlington National Cemetery in Arlington, Arlington County, Virginia, USA.; plot: Sec: 4, Site: 2647-A W

Decorations and awards
Rear Admiral Garcia's military awards include:

   Bronze Star with Combat "V" 
   2nd Nicaraguan Campaign Medal
   China Service Medal
   American Defense Service Medal
   American Campaign Medal
   European-African-Middle Eastern Campaign Medal with  star 
   Asiatic-Pacific Campaign Medal with  star
   World War II Victory Medal
   Navy Occupation Service Medal (with Asia clasp)
   National Defense Service Medal
Badges:
   Naval Aviator Badge

See also

Hispanic Admirals in the United States Navy
List of Puerto Ricans
Puerto Ricans in World War II
List of Puerto Rican military personnel
Hispanics in the United States Naval Academy
Hispanics in the United States Navy

References

Further reading
 Boudonck, Greg. Puertorriquenos Who Served With Guts, Glory, and Honor. Fighting to Defend a Nation Not Completely Their Own. ; 

1905 births
1971 deaths
United States Navy personnel of World War II
Burials at Arlington National Cemetery
People from San Juan, Puerto Rico
American military personnel of the Banana Wars
Puerto Rican United States Navy personnel
United States Navy rear admirals (lower half)
Puerto Rican military officers
United States Naval Academy alumni
United States submarine commanders